Huchcha is a 2001 Indian Kannada-language romantic action film directed by Om Prakash Rao, starring Sudeep and Rekha Vedavyas in the lead roles. The film, the Kannada remake of the 1999 Tamil film Sethu directed by Bala and starring Vikram, released to positive reviews and brought lot of fame to Sudeep. Earlier the script was rejected by Upendra and Shivarajkumar. The film Huchcha 2 is not a continuation of this film but has a similar theme.

Plot 
Sachidananda aka Kiccha (Sudeep) is a rough and macho college rowdy and also The Students Union Chairman of the college, who uses violence as the only way to deal with people. He lives with his brother, a Magistrate (Avinash), and his sister-in-law, who is the only person who seems to understand him properly.

The movie opens with Kiccha winning the elections to the office bearers of the college's Students Union followed by celebrations and in-campus fight between the rival candidates.

Kiccha has a staple diet of yes-sir friends surrounding him. He comes across a timid girl, Abishta (Rekha Vedavyas), who is the daughter of a poor temple priest, and starts to woo her. When she initially rejects him, he kidnaps her and forces her to fall in love with him.

After Abishta falls in love with him, Kiccha is attacked by brothel goons who take revenge on him for interfering with their business. Kiccha suffers from brain damage as a result and ends up in a swamiji ashram. With no memory of his past and having developed an unusual behaviour, he starts to recollect memories. At one point, he is completely back to his normal self and tries to convince the wardens and Swamiji that he's back to normal and can be released. However, the Swamiji ignores him and the wardens beat him up. Desperate, Kiccha tries to escape by climbing over the gates. Unfortunately, he fails and ends up with serious injuries.

Whilst sleeping with his injury, Abishta makes a surprise visit. However Kiccha is asleep and she leaves with this woeful memory of him. As she is about to leave the institution, he wakes up and realises that she had come to see him. As he calls out, she leaves unable to hear him.

Persistent to meet her, Kiccha makes another attempt to leave the institution and this time he is successful. When he arrives at Abishta's house however, he is presented with Abishta unfortunately dead. He then realises that she had committed suicide.

Distraught after what he saw, Kiccha just walks out and his previous friends and family try to help him remember who he is. Despite being aware of what's happening around him, Kiccha pretends to be unconscious. At that point he is met with the mental institution wardens who came chasing after him. The film ends with Kiccha leaving with them as he has nothing to live for after his true love's death.

Cast 

 Sudeep as Sachidananda aka Kiccha
 Rekha Vedavyas as Abishta
 Avinash as Kiccha's brother
 Pavitra Lokesh
 Shailaja Joshi
 Sana as Kiccha's sister-in-law
 M. N. Lakshmi Devi
 Shivaram
 Sridhar
 Tarakesh Patel as Kiccha's friend 
 Anju Mahendra as Kiccha's friend

Track list 

Soundtrack was composed by Rajesh Ramanath. The songs "Enge Sellum" and "Vaarthai Thavari Vittai" from the original film were retained here as "Yaaro Yaaro" and "Maathu Thappidalu" respectively.

Awards 

Filmfare Awards South :-

 Won, Best Actor – Sudeep
 Nominated, Best Film
 Nominated, Best Director – Om Prakash Rao
 Nominated, Best Actress – Rekha Vedavyas
 Nominated, Best Music Director – Rajesh Ramanath  {Best Playback singer : Rajesh krishnan}

References

External links 
 

2001 films
2000s Kannada-language films
2000s action drama films
2001 romantic drama films
Indian action drama films
Indian romantic drama films
Films scored by Rajesh Ramnath
Kannada remakes of Tamil films
Films directed by Om Prakash Rao